Events from the year 1972 in Taiwan, Republic of China. This year is numbered Minguo 61 according to the official Republic of China calendar.

Incumbents
 President – Chiang Kai-shek
 Vice President – Yen Chia-kan
 Premier – Yen Chia-kan, Chiang Ching-kuo
 Vice Premier – Chiang Ching-kuo, Hsu Ching-chung

Events

January
 1 January – The establishment of CTS Education and Culture.

March
 17 March – The commissioning of Unit 2 of Linkou Power Plant in Taipei County.
 27 March – The establishment of Van Nung School of Industrial Skills in Zhongli City, Taoyuan County.

April
 24 April – The 7.2  Ruisui earthquake occurred in Hualien County.

May
 16 May – The establishment of Sun Yat-sen Memorial Hall in Xinyi District, Taipei City.

July
 1 July – The upgrade of Banqiao and Fongshan from urban townships to be county-administered cities.
 12 July – The reopening of Yunlin Prison after relocation in Huwei Township, Yunlin County.

December
 23 December – 1972 Republic of China National Assembly and legislative election.
 29 December – The changing of Tourism Council to Tourism Bureau.

Full date unknown
 The Death Duel, a Taiwanese and Hong Kong film is released.

Births
 10 January – Chang Hung-lu, member of Legislative Yuan
 30 March – Mickey Huang, comedian and television host
 23 April – Hsu Hsin-ying, founder and Chairperson of Minkuotang (2015–2018)
 26 June – Yang Cheng-wu, Magistrate of Kinmen County
 29 June – Chao Chien-ming, surgeon
 24 July – Chiu Chih-wei, member of Legislative Yuan
 9 August – A-mei, singer and songwriter
 24 August – Francesca Kao, actress, singer and television host
 7 October – Will Liu, singer, composer, songwriter and actor
 11 December – Brenda Wang, actress and model
 25 December – Jeannie Hsieh, singer-songwriter, dancer, actress and model

Deaths
 25 June – Ku Meng-yu, Vice Premier of the Republic of China (1948).

References

 
Years of the 20th century in Taiwan